Ella Sabljak (born 17 October 1991)  is an Australian 1.0 point wheelchair basketball player. She represented Australia at the 2020 Summer Paralympics in Tokyo.

Biography
Ella Louise Sabljak was born on 17 October 1991. A 1.0 point Guard, she began playing wheelchair basketball for the Brisbane-based Queensland Comets in the Women's National Wheelchair Basketball League in 2011. The Comets won the league championship in 2014, a year in which she was named the league Most Valuable Player 1-pointer. In 2015, she averaged three points and four rebounds per game. She also played with the mixed National Wheelchair Basketball League competition.

In 2011, she was part of the Australian junior team (the Devils) at the 2011 Women's U25 Wheelchair Basketball World Championship in St. Catharines, Ontario, Canada, winning silver. Four years later she was captain of the Devils at the 2015 Women's U25 Wheelchair Basketball World Championship in Beijing, again winning silver.

She made her senior international debut with the Australia women's national wheelchair basketball team (the Gliders) that year at the Osaka Cup in Japan in February 2013. She subsequently played for the Gliders  at the Osaka Cup in February 2015, the 2015 IWBF Asia-Oceania Championships in Chiba, Japan, in October 2015, the Osaka Cup in February 2016, and the 2017 IWBF Asia-Oceania Championships in Beijing in October 2017.

She represented Australia at the 2018 Wheelchair Basketball World Championship where the team came ninth.

At the 2020 Tokyo Paralympics, the Gliders finished ninth after winning the 9th-10th classification match. 

She was a member of the Australian team that won the silver medal in the 3x3 Women's tournament at the 2022 Commonwealth Games.

Wheelchair rugby
Sabljak classified as a 2.5 player won her first world championship gold medal at the 2022 IWRF World Championship in Vejle, Denmark, when Australia defeated the United States. 

She studied education at Griffith University in Queensland, and is a qualified primary school teacher. The University awarded her a full blue for wheelchair basketball in 2015.

Notes

External links
 
 Basketball Australia Profile
 

Australian women's wheelchair basketball players
Wheelchair basketball players at the 2020 Summer Paralympics
Living people
Commonwealth Games silver medallists for Australia
Commonwealth Games medallists in basketball
Australian wheelchair rugby players
Sportswomen from Victoria (Australia)
1991 births
Guards (basketball)
20th-century Australian women
21st-century Australian women
Medallists at the 2022 Commonwealth Games